Daubenya is a genus of bulbous flowering plants in the family Asparagaceae, subfamily Scilloideae (also treated as the family Hyacinthaceae). It is native to the Cape Province of South Africa.

Description

Species of Daubenya grow from bulbs covered with a brownish tunic. Each bulb produces only two leaves, which appear with the flowers and normally spread out along the ground on either side. The inflorescence is a raceme, usually very condensed and close to the ground. Individual flowers are white, pink, yellow or red, sometimes with the tepals furthest from the flowering stem (i.e. on the outside of the inflorescence) larger than the others. The tepals are fused at the base forming a distinct tube. The stamens arise from the mouth of this tube, and are often very prominent. The more or less globe-shaped black seeds are produced inside a papery capsule.

Species
, the World Checklist of Selected Plant Families recognized eight species: All but D. aurea were transferred to the genus Daubenya during revisions of the South African members of the Scilloideae in early 2000s; they were previously placed in Androsiphon, Amphisiphon, Polyxena, Massonia, or Neobakeria.

References

External links

  – photographs of six species
  – photographs of seven species

 
Asparagaceae genera